The St. Lawrence String Quartet is a Canadian string quartet, and one of Canada's premier chamber ensembles.

The Quartet was founded in 1989 and has served residencies at the Juilliard School, Yale University, the University of Toronto, the Hartt School, and Stanford University.  In 1992 the Quartet won first prize in the Fourth Banff International String Quartet Competition and the Young Concert Artists International Auditions. They have also won a Juno Award and a Preis der Deutsches Schallplaten Kritik, for their EMI recording of Schumann Quartets.

The Quartet recorded four CDs for EMI (including quartets by Tchaikovsky, Schumann, Shostakovich, and Osvaldo Golijov's "Yiddishbuk." A new CD of Haydn is in production). Among the composers whose works the Quartet was to premiere in 2008 to 2010 were John Adams (to be premiered January 2009), Ezequiel Viñao (to be premiered December 2009), Osvaldo Golijov (including a new string quartet in preparation), David Bruce (for clarinet and string quartet, commissioned by Carnegie Hall), and Canadian composers Derek Charke, Suzanne Hebert-Tremblay, Brian Current, Elizabeth Raum, and Marcus Goddard, each representing a different province in Canada.

Other collaborations by the Quartet with composers have included R. Murray Schafer (first performance of his String Quartet 3, in 1994, and of his "Four-Forty" in 2002), Jonathan Berger (premiere of "Miracles and Mud," 2001 and "The Bridal Canopy," 2008), Christos Hatzis ("Awakenings," May 2005), and Roberto Sierra ("Songs from the Diaspora," February 2007).

Members
The first violin chair is currently open following the death of Geoff Nuttall.
Owen Dalby, second violin (joined May 31, 2015) 
Lesley Robertson, viola  (a co-founder of the quartet) 
Christopher Costanza, cello (joined September 2003)

Prior members
 Geoff Nuttall, first violin and a co-founder of the quartet  died on October 19, 2022. 
 Marina Hoover, cello (co-founding member) retired from the quartet in 2003
 Scott St. John, second violin from 2006 through 2013
 Barry Shiffman, second violin (co-founding member)

References

External links
 
 Article at thecanadianencyclopedia.ca
 
 

Musical groups established in 1989
Canadian string quartets
Juno Award for Classical Album of the Year – Solo or Chamber Ensemble winners
EMI Classics and Virgin Classics artists